Erysimum cazorlense is a short-lived, mostly monocarpic herb endemic to the Cazorla and Segura mountain ranges, SE Spain. Erysimum cazorlense may be treated as a distinct species or as Erysimum myriophyllum subsp. cazorlense.

It grows from 1500 to 2000 meters above sea level and inhabits Pinus nigra forests and high Mediterranean scrublands.

References

cazorlense
Flora of Spain